The 2015 WSBL season was the 27th season of the Women's State Basketball League (SBL). The regular season began on Friday 13 March, with Perry Lakes and Kalamunda hosting East Perth and Mandurah respectively. The 2015 WSBL All-Star Game was played on 1 June at Bendat Basketball Centre – the home of basketball in Western Australia. The regular season ended on Saturday 25 July. The finals began on Friday 31 July and ended on Friday 28 August, when the Rockingham Flames defeated the Willetton Tigers in the WSBL Grand Final.

Regular season
The regular season began on Friday 13 March and ended on Saturday 25 July after 20 rounds of competition.

Standings

Finals
The finals began on Friday 31 July and ended on Friday 28 August with the WSBL Grand Final.

Bracket

All-Star Game
The 2015 WSBL All-Star Game took place at Bendat Basketball Centre on Monday 1 June, with all proceeds going to Youth Focus to help prevent youth suicide.

Rosters

Game data

Awards

Player of the Week

Statistics leaders

Regular season
 Most Valuable Player: Sami Whitcomb (Rockingham Flames)
 Coach of the Year: Randy Miegel (Mandurah Magic)
 Most Improved Player: Ashleigh Grant (Lakeside Lightning)
 All-Star Five:
 PG: Kate Malpass (Willetton Tigers)
 SG: Casey Mihovilovich (Mandurah Magic)
 SF: Sami Whitcomb (Rockingham Flames)
 PF: Deanna Smith (Cockburn Cougars)
 C: Louella Tomlinson (Willetton Tigers)

Finals
 Grand Final MVP: Sami Whitcomb (Rockingham Flames)

References

External links
 2015 fixtures
 2015 media guide

2015
2014–15 in Australian basketball
2015–16 in Australian basketball
basketball